CM10: Free Game is the eleventh studio album by American rapper Yo Gotti. It was released on February 4, 2022, via Collective Music Group/Inevitable Entertainment. It features guest appearances from 42 Dugg, Blac Youngsta, EST Gee, Kodak Black, Moneybagg Yo, Shenseea and DaBaby. The album debuted at number three on the US Billboard 200 albums chart with the first-week consumption sales of 46,000 copies.

Track listing

Charts

Weekly charts

Year-end charts

References

External links 
 

2022 albums
Sequel albums
Yo Gotti albums
Collective Music Group albums